Team Kuortane is an ice hockey team in the Naisten Liiga, the premier women's hockey league in Finland. The team was founded by the Finnish Ice Hockey Association in 2010 as part of its initiative to develop the ice hockey skills of young women in Finland. Since its creation, approximately half of all national under-18 team rosters have been filled by players from Team Kuortane. For sponsorship reasons, the team was called Team Oriflame Kuortane during 2010 to 2014.

Season-by-season results 
List of all seasons completed by Team Kuortane.Note: Finish = Rank at end of regular season; GP = Games played, W = Wins (3 points), OTW = Overtime wins (2 points), OTL = Overtime losses (1 point), L = Losses, GF = Goals for, GA = Goals against, Pts = Points, Top scorer: Points (Goals+Assists)

Players and personnel

2022–23 roster 

Coaching staff and team personnel
 Head coach: Mira Kuisma
 Assistant coach: Kari Eloranta
 Goaltending coach: Aku Perälä
 Team manager: Pirjo Hautaniemi
 Equipment manager: Janne Hautamaa

Team captains 
 Salla Tammisalo, 2010–11
 Christa Alanko, 2011–12
 Anna Kilponen, 2012–13
 Sara Säkkinen, 2015–2017
 Sini Karjalainen, 2017–18
 Kiia Nousiainen, 2018–19
 Emilia Vesa, 2019–20
 Anna-Lotta Räsänen, 2020–21
 Nea Tervonen, 2021–

Head coaches 
 Jari Risku, 2010–2018
 Arttu Sissala, 2018–19
 Mira Kuisma, 2019–

Team honours

Finnish Championship 
  Aurora Borealis Cup Third Place (1): 2018

U20 SM-turnaus 
The under-20 (U20) Finnish Championship (SM) tournament is a competition for the top women's under-20 ice hockey teams from across Finland. Team Kuortane has medaled at all but one tournament since the team's founding in 2010. The championship was not held in 2020 or 2021 due to the COVID-19 pandemic.
  Finnish Champions (6): 2013, 2014, 2016, 2017, 2018, 2019
  Runner-up (1): 2012
  Third Place (1): 2011

Notable alumnae 
Years active with Team Kuortane listed with players' names.
 Sini Karjalainen, 2015–2018
 Anni Keisala, 2013–2016
 Anna Kilponen, 2011–2014
 Niina Mäkinen, 2010–11
 Petra Nieminen, 2015–2018
 Jenniina Nylund, 2015–2018
 Suvi Ollikainen, 2011–2014
 Tiina Ranne, 2010–2014
 Sanni Rantala, 2017–2021
 Eve Savander, 2014–2018
 Jenna Suokko, 2012–2014
 Eveliina Suonpää, 2011–2014
 Sara Säkkinen, 2014–2018
 Vilma Tanskanen, 2011–2014
 Viivi Vainikka, 2016–2020
 Saana Valkama, 2010–2014
 Emilia Vesa, 2016–2020
 Ella Viitasuo, 2012–2015
 Kiira Yrjänen, 2017–2021

References

External links 
 Team information and statistics from Eliteprospects.com and Eurohockey.com and Hockeyarchives.info (in French)
  (in Finnish)
  (in Finnish)
  (in Finnish)

Kuortane
Kuortane
2010 establishments in Finland